Charles Rosa (born August 24, 1986) is an American professional mixed martial artist currently competing in the Featherweight division of the Ultimate Fighting Championship.

Background
Charles is of Italian descent and, the son of Chucky and Mary Rosa was born and raised in Peabody, Massachusetts. Rosa's father, grandfather, and uncle were all professional boxers. Rosa had two older brothers, Domenic and Vincent, who both died from accidental drug overdoses. He also has a sister, Teresa, and two younger brothers, Lucas and Francis. Growing up, Rosa played football, hockey, lacrosse, and also trained in karate.

Rosa continued playing lacrosse at Johnson & Wales University, where he also earned a degree in the culinary arts. After graduating from the college, Rosa later relocated to Florida to find a fresh start. Looking for a boxing gym, Rosa stumbled upon American Top Team gym, where he began to train in mixed martial arts.

Mixed martial arts career

Early career
Rosa compiled an amateur MMA record of 11-2 and made his professional debut in 2012 competing in regional promotions across the Northeastern United States. He compiled an undefeated record of 9-0, finishing all of his opponents before signing with the UFC in the summer of 2014.

Ultimate Fighting Championship
Rosa made his promotional debut as a short notice replacement against Dennis Siver on October 4, 2014 at UFC Fight Night 53, replacing an injured Robert Whiteford.  Siver won the back and forth fight via unanimous decision.  Subsequently, both participants earned Fight of the Night honors.

Rosa faced Sean Soriano on January 18, 2015 at UFC Fight Night 59.  Rosa won the bout via submission in the third round.

Rosa then faced Yair Rodríguez on June 13, 2015 at UFC 188. He lost the fight by split decision. Despite the loss, Rosa also earned Rodríguez his second Fight of the Night bonus award.

Rosa was originally expected to face Jimy Hettes on January 17, 2016 at UFC Fight Night 81. However, Hettes pulled out of the fight in the week leading up to the event and was very briefly replaced by promotional newcomer Augusto Mendes. Just two days later, Mendes was removed from the fight and was replaced by Kyle Bochniak. Rosa won the fight via unanimous decision.

Rosa faced Shane Burgos on April 8, 2017 at UFC 210. He lost the fight via TKO in the third round. Both participants were awarded Fight of the Night for their performance.

Rosa was expected to face Mizuto Hirota on September 23, 2017 at UFC Fight Night 117. However, the bout was canceled on the day of the weigh-ins as Hirota missed weight and was deemed medically unfit to compete.

Rosa was expected to face Dan Ige on January 20, 2018 at UFC 220. However, on December 22, 2017, it was reported that Rosa was pulled from the event due to neck injury.

After hiatus for 30 months due to neck injury, Rosa returned and faced Manny Bermudez on October 18, 2019 at UFC on ESPN 6. At the weigh-in,  Bermudez weighed in at 148 pounds, 2 pounds over the featherweight non-title fight limit of 146. The bout was held at catchweight.  Bermudez was fined 20% of his purse  which went to  Rosa. He won the fight via a submission in round one. This win earned him the Performance of the Night'' award.

Rosa was scheduled to face Bryce Mitchell on May 2, 2020 at UFC Fight Night: Hermansson vs. Weidman. However, on April 9, Dana White, the president of UFC announced that this event was postponed and the bout eventually took place on May 9, 2020 at UFC 249. He lost the fight via unanimous decision.

Rosa faced Kevin Aguilar on June 13, 2020 at UFC on ESPN: Eye vs. Calvillo. He won the fight via split decision.

Rosa faced Darrick Minner on February 20, 2021 at UFC Fight Night: Blaydes vs. Lewis. He lost the fight via unanimous decision.

Rosa faced Justin Jaynes on June 26, 2021 at UFC Fight Night 190. He won the fight by split decision.

As the last fight of his prevailing contract, Rosa faced Damon Jackson  on October 9, 2021 at UFC Fight Night 194. He lost the fight via unanimous decision.

Rosa, as a replacement for Gabriel Benítez on three days notice, is scheduled to face T.J. Brown on January 15, 2022 at UFC on ESPN: Kattar vs. Chikadze. In conjunction with the bout, Rosa signed a new four-fight contract with the UFC. He lost the fight via unanimous decision.

Rosa faced Nathaniel Wood on July 23, 2022 at UFC Fight Night: Blaydes vs. Aspinall. He lost the bout via unanimous decision.

Personal life
In addition to competing, Rosa works as a chef at an upscale steakhouse, Cut 432, in Delray Beach, Florida.

Championships and accomplishments
Ultimate Fighting Championship
Fight of the Night (Three times) 
Performance of the Night (One time)

Mixed martial arts record

|-
|Loss
|align=center|14–8
|Nathaniel Wood
|Decision (unanimous)
|UFC Fight Night: Blaydes vs. Aspinall 
|
|align=center|3
|align=center|5:00
|London, England
|
|-
|Loss
|align=center|14–7
|T.J. Brown
|Decision (unanimous)
|UFC on ESPN: Kattar vs. Chikadze
|
|align=center|3
|align=center|5:00
|Las Vegas, Nevada, United States
|
|-
|Loss
|align=center|14–6
|Damon Jackson
|Decision (unanimous)
|UFC Fight Night: Dern vs. Rodriguez
|
|align=center|3
|align=center|5:00
|Las Vegas, Nevada, United States
|
|-
|Win
|align=center|14–5
|Justin Jaynes
|Decision (split)
|UFC Fight Night: Gane vs. Volkov
|
|align=center|3
|align=center|5:00
|Las Vegas, Nevada, United States
|
|-
|Loss
|align=center|13–5
|Darrick Minner
|Decision (unanimous)
|UFC Fight Night: Blaydes vs. Lewis
|
|align=center|3
|align=center|5:00
|Las Vegas, Nevada, United States
|
|-
|Win
|align=center|13–4
|Kevin Aguilar
|Decision (split)
|UFC on ESPN: Eye vs. Calvillo
|
|align=center|3
|align=center|5:00
|Las Vegas, Nevada, United States
|
|-
|Loss
|align=center|12–4
|Bryce Mitchell
|Decision (unanimous)
|UFC 249 
|
|align=center|3
|align=center|5:00
|Jacksonville, Florida, United States
|
|-
|Win
|align=center|12–3
|Manny Bermudez
|Submission (armbar) 
|UFC on ESPN: Reyes vs. Weidman 
|
|align=center|1
|align=center|2:46
|Boston, Massachusetts, United States
|
|-
|Loss
|align=center|11–3
|Shane Burgos
|TKO (punches)
|UFC 210
|
|align=center|3
|align=center|1:59
|Buffalo, New York, United States
|
|-
|Win
|align=center|11–2
|Kyle Bochniak
|Decision (unanimous)
|UFC Fight Night: Dillashaw vs. Cruz
|
|align=center|3
|align=center|5:00
|Boston, Massachusetts, United States
|
|-
|Loss
|align=center|10–2
|Yair Rodríguez
|Decision (split)
|UFC 188
|
|align=center|3
|align=center|5:00
|Mexico City, Mexico
|
|-
| Win
|align=center| 10–1
|Sean Soriano
| Submission (D'Arce choke)
|UFC Fight Night: McGregor vs. Siver
|
|align=center|3
|align=center|4:43
|Boston, Massachusetts, United States
|
|-
| Loss
|align=center| 9–1
|Dennis Siver
| Decision (unanimous)
|UFC Fight Night: Nelson vs. Story
|
|align=center|3
|align=center|5:00
|Stockholm, Sweden
|
|-
| Win
|align=center| 9–0
|Jake Constant
| Submission (armbar) 
|CES MMA 25
|
|align=center|1
|align=center|3:36
|Lincoln, Rhode Island, United States
|
|-
| Win
|align=center| 8–0
|Brylan Van Artsdalen
| Submission (armbar)
|CES MMA 22
|
|align=center|1
|align=center|3:25
|Lincoln, Rhode Island, United States
|
|-
| Win
|align=center| 7–0
|Keith Richardson
| TKO (punches)
|Fight Lab 35
|
|align=center|2
|align=center|2:08
|Charlotte, North Carolina, United States
|
|-
| Win
|align=center| 6–0
|Ralph Johnson
| Submission (anaconda choke)
|CES MMA 20
|
|align=center|1
|align=center|3:03
|Lincoln, Rhode Island, United States
|
|-
| Win
|align=center| 5–0
|Steve McCabe
| Submission (Peruvian necktie)
|CES MMA: Rise or Fall
|
|align=center|1
|align=center|1:39
|Lincoln, Rhode Island, United States
|
|-
| Win
|align=center| 4–0
|Sylvester Murataj
| TKO (punches)
|CES MMA: Gold Rush
|
|align=center|1
|align=center|0:46
|Lincoln, Rhode Island, United States
|
|-
| Win
|align=center| 3–0
|Aaron Steadman
| Submission (triangle choke)
|CFA 11
|
|align=center|1
|align=center|3:26
|Coral Gables, Florida, United States
|
|-
| Win
|align=center| 2–0
|Jason Jones
| TKO (punches)
|CFA 9
|
|align=center|1
|align=center|3:52
|Coral Gables, Florida, United States
|
|-
| Win
|align=center| 1–0
|Hauley Tillman
| Submission (armbar)
|CFA 9
|
|align=center|1
|align=center|1:56
|Fort Lauderdale, Florida, United States
|
|-

See also
 List of current UFC fighters
 List of male mixed martial artists

References

External links

Living people
1986 births
American male mixed martial artists
American people of Italian descent
Mixed martial artists from Massachusetts
Mixed martial artists utilizing karate
Mixed martial artists utilizing Brazilian jiu-jitsu
People from Peabody, Massachusetts
Johnson & Wales University alumni
American male karateka
American practitioners of Brazilian jiu-jitsu
People awarded a black belt in Brazilian jiu-jitsu
Ultimate Fighting Championship male fighters
Sportspeople from Essex County, Massachusetts